Gostishchevo is a rural locality (a selo) and the administrative center of Gostishchevskoye Rural Settlement, Yakovlevsky District, Belgorod Oblast, Russia. The population was 2,731 as of 2010. There are 50 streets.

Geography 
Gostishchevo is located 18 km east of Stroitel (the district's administrative centre) by road. Druzhny is the nearest rural locality.

References 

Rural localities in Yakovlevsky District, Belgorod Oblast
Belgorodsky Uyezd